Villemotier is a commune in the Ain department in eastern France.

Geography
The Solnan forms parts of the commune's eastern and western borders; it flows southwest through the eastern part of the commune and north through its middle.

Population

See also
Communes of the Ain department

References

Communes of Ain
Ain communes articles needing translation from French Wikipedia